The boys' singles of the tournament 2019 BWF World Junior Championships was held from 7 to 13 October 2019. The defending champions is Kunlavut Vitidsarn from Thailand.

Seeds 

  Kunlavut Vitidsarn (champion)
  Brian Yang (fourth round)
  Liu Liang (fifth round)
  Li Yunze (semifinals)
  Syabda Perkasa Belawa (third round)
  Bobby Setiabudi (quarterfinals)
  Meiraba Luwang Maisnam (third round)
  Christian Adinata (fourth round)

  Georgii Karpov (second round)
  Christo Popov (final)
  Tomas Toledano (third round)
  Kok Jing Hong (fourth round)
  Yonathan Ramlie (semifinals)
  Ernesto Baschwitz (second round)
  Luka Ban (second round)
  Setthanan Piyawatcharavijit (fifth round)

Draw

Finals

Top half

Section 1

Section 2

Section 3

Section 4

Section 5

Section 6

Section 7

Section 8

Bottom half

Section 9

Section 10

Section 11

Section 12

Section 13

Section 14

Section 15

Section 16

References

2019 BWF World Junior Championships